Drepanodontus tatyanae is a species of sea snail, a marine gastropod mollusk in the family Buccinidae.

Behavior and Life Cycle
The species is demersal, living close to the sea bed. They are broadcast spawners. Drepandodontus tatyanae grow from embryos to trochophores to veligers before maturing into adults.

Distribution
This species is distributed in the Scotia Sea, South Atlantic.

References

 Harasewych M.G. & Kantor Y.I. 2004. The deep-sea Buccinoidea (Gastropoda: Neogastropoda) of the Scotia Sea and adjacent abyssal plains and trenches. The Nautilus 118(1): 1-42
 Bouchet, P.; Fontaine, B. (2009). List of new marine species described between 2002-2006. Census of Marine Life

External links

Buccinidae
Gastropods described in 2004